"Starlight" is a song by English alternative rock band Muse. It was released on 22 August 2006 in the United Kingdom as the second single from their fourth studio album Black Holes and Revelations (2006). The lyric "Our hopes and expectations, black holes and revelations" gives the album its title.

The song peaked at number 13 on the UK Singles Chart. It was also the second single released in the United States, reaching number two on the Modern Rock Tracks chart. The song was first played live during the Radio 1's Big Weekend festival in summer 2006.

Composition 
"Starlight" was written by Muse lead vocalist Matt Bellamy and produced by Rich Costey. Bellamy commented that he first wrote the song on a boat in bad weather. Bassist Chris Wolstenholme commented that it is "a love song about missing someone, friends, family, someone you love".

According to the music sheet published at Musicnotes.com by Sony/ATV Music Publishing, "Starlight" is an alternative rock song. It is set in the time signature of common time and composed in a moderate tempo of 121.5 beats per minute with the bridge sped up to 122.5 beats per minute. It is set in the key of, B major with Bellamy's vocals ranging from G3 to B4.

When the song is performed live, it is transposed a half step down to B-flat major to accommodate Bellamy's deepening voice. It is noticeable during the band's performance at Reading Festival 2006 and during HAARP.

Production 
Wolstenholme described "Starlight" as the hardest song on the album to record, stating it "was one of the songs we went around in circles with, and we recorded maybe six or seven different versions of it."

Alternative versions 
An alternative mix of "Starlight", known as the "New Mix", "Radio Mix" or "Radio Version" was distributed on promotional media only. This version was presumably created to give the song a sound more suitable for radio broadcast.

Music video 
Muse worked with Paul Minor on Starlight's music video, which was filmed in Los Angeles. In the video, the band perform on the deck of the MS Ocean Chie, a handysize bulk carrier. Band members are also carrying flares, in an attempt to get rescued, but in the end this fails, and they are abandoned. This relates to the song's lyrics, which mentions ships and abandonment.

Bellamy stated in an interview with The Sunday Mail that the band wanted to "create the idea of a band lost at sea because we see ourselves as being outside what's happening in the music scene." He also told the interviewer, Billy Sloan, that "it was an epic feeling playing on a huge platform with the sea all around us."

Commercial use 
"Starlight" was heard in 2006's CBS short-lived cult TV series Jericho. The song was also used on clips for the 2009 NFL and NCAA season. It can also be heard during the closing credits of the 2010 film The Tourist, starring Angelina Jolie and Johnny Depp. It was also used in the trailer for the 2011 film Crazy, Stupid, Love and the song is used in the title sequence for international football on Sky Sports. The song also played in the YouTube video "Going Through It!" starring Katy Perry.

Critical reception 
"Starlight" received overall positive reviews. MusicOMH stated that the song was "a track perfectly at home on drivetime radio" while saying it "showcases another side to the band's music and their staggering breadth of appeal." Leeds Music Scene reviewer Maria Pinto-Fernandes gave "Starlight" a glowing review, with a score of 4.5 stars out of 5. In her review, she commented that "the band's musical arrangements on the track do not come into being just by accident." She also stated that the song was just as passionate when performed live as when heard on CD. A harsh review came from NME with the reviewer stating that the song "is a tune so chart-hungry it's virtually dry-humping JK and Joel's legs." However, "Starlight" would become one of Muse's most well-known songs, gaining significant international radio airplay, and being performed live in practically all of Muse's live shows after its release.

Chart performance 
"Starlight" entered the UK Singles Chart the week of 3 September at number 38 via digital downloads. The following week, and with the physical release in the United Kingdom, the single peaked at number 13. Since then, the single's chart position steadily declined, and it remained in the Top 75 after fifteen weeks, during the week of 11 December 2006. The next week, "Starlight" had fallen out of the Top 75.

It was certified Platinum by RIAA for 1,000,000 paid downloads, but reached only #101 on the US Hot 100 as a result of minimal mainstream radio airplay (as noted below, it was a substantial hit on specialized modern rock radio stations).

"Starlight" has also peaked at number two on Billboard's Modern Rock Tracks chart, Muse's fourth highest-charting single to date on any major chart in the US. It also charted in at number nine on the Triple J Hottest 100, 2006. It was also ranked at number four on Colombian radio station Radiónica's 2006 top 100.

Track listings

7" picture disc 
 "Starlight" – 3:59
 "Supermassive Black Hole" (Phones Control Voltage Mix) – 4:19

CD 
 "Starlight" – 3:59
 "Easily" – 3:40

DVD 
 "Starlight" (video) – 4:07
 "Starlight" (audio) – 3:59
 "Starlight" (making of the video)
 "Hidden Track"*
*The 'hidden track' on the DVD release is a short song. It is sung in a distorted falsetto voice with profane lyrics (largely variations of the word 'fuck' with some instruments in the background). Between fans it is often referred as "You Fucking Motherfucker", but in August 2018, Bellamy stated on his Twitter account that the actual lyrics of the song are "You Funky Motherfucker". The cowbell click-track was left in the song.

Charts

Weekly charts

Year-end charts

Certifications

References

External links 
MUSE – official artist website
MUSE – Starlight – official single website

Muse (band) songs
2006 singles
Rock ballads
Song recordings produced by Rich Costey